Poling is an unincorporated community in Jay County, Indiana, United States.

History
A post office was established at Poling in 1887, and remained in operation until it was discontinued in 1907. William Poling served as an early postmaster.

References

Unincorporated communities in Jay County, Indiana
Unincorporated communities in Indiana